Owo Blow is a 1996 Yoruba-language drama film directed by Tade Ogidan. It was made in 3 parts namely; The Genesis, The Revolt, and The Final Struggle. It served as the first acting role for Femi Adebayo, Rachael Oniga and Bimbo Akintola.

Background 
The major theme of the movie surrounds showing kindness and paying it forward. It explored issues including corruption, unemployment, extrajudicial punishment and wrongful practices by law enforcement officials which are persistent prevailing Nigerian national issues. It is a Yoruba language film which was subtitled in English.

Plot 
A man was imprisoned unfairly when he tried to help some traders who were being harassed by officials of the State Task Force. This throws the man's family into disarray; his son, Wole is sent out of school and has to rise up to provide for his family. He tries his hands at many vocations before eventually resorting to pickpocketing. He gets caught and mob justice is meted out on him. He soon resorts to a life on the streets while his sister, Mope resorts to prostitution. She falls pregnant and dies in labour. Wale becomes a notorious armed robber but makes a vow not to shed human blood. He eventually makes a turnaround, completes his education and becomes a responsible member of the society. His former gang members however persist in the trade. He however still suffers from guilt due to his previous misdeeds.

Cast 
Femi Adebayo

Prince Leke Ajao

Bimbo Akintola

Adewale Elesho

Lanre Hassan

Binta Ayo Mogaji

Sam Loco Efe

Binta Ayo Mogaji

Kayode Odumosu

Rachael Oniga

Adebayo Salami

Production and release 
Owo Blow was classified as one of the big budget Nigerian films of 1996; the budgets ranged from ₦2-7million ($25,000-90,000).  It was released at Christmas time in 1996 and a cinema ticket cost ₦150 at the time.

Reception 
A reviewer for Premium Times lauded the movie for its cast, directing and brevity saying "There was no part of the movie that was not relevant to the plot of the film. 25 years after, ‘Owo Blow’ remains a classic any day."

References

External links 

 

1995 films
Yoruba-language films
Nigerian drama films